A molecular phylogenetic study in 2020 showed that as then circumscribed Boronia was polyphyletic, and species were moved to other genera, mainly Cyanothamnus. The split was accepted in a 2021 classification of the family Rutaceae. The following list shows the species accepted by Plants of the World Online, .

Boronia adamsiana F.Muell.
Boronia affinis R.Br. ex Benth.
Boronia alata Sm.
Boronia albiflora R.Br. ex Benth.
Boronia algida F.Muell.
Boronia alulata Sol. ex Benth.
Boronia amabilis S.T.Blake
Boronia amplectens Duretto
Boronia anceps Paul G.Wilson
Boronia angustisepala Duretto
Boronia anomala Duretto
Boronia barkeriana F.Muell.
Boronia barrettiorum Duretto
Boronia beeronensis Duretto
Boronia bella Duretto
Boronia boliviensis J.B.Williams & J.T.Hunter
Boronia bowmanii F.Muell.
Boronia capitata Benth.
Boronia chartacea P.H.Weston
Boronia citrata N.G.Walsh
Boronia citriodora Gunn ex Hook.f.
Boronia clavata Paul G.Wilson
Boronia coriacea Paul G.Wilson
Boronia corynophylla Paul G.Wilson
Boronia crassifolia Bartl.
Boronia crassipes Bartl.
Boronia cremnophila R.L.Barrett, M.D.Barrett & Duretto
Boronia crenulata Sm.
Boronia cymosa Endl.
Boronia deanei Maiden & Betche
Boronia decumbens Duretto
Boronia denticulata Sm.
Boronia dichotoma Lindl.
Boronia duiganiae Duretto
Boronia edwardsii Benth.
Boronia elisabethiae Duretto
Boronia eriantha Lindl.
Boronia ericifolia Benth.
Boronia excelsa Duretto
Boronia exilis Paul G.Wilson
Boronia falcifolia A.Cunn. ex Endl.
Boronia fastigiata Bartl.
Boronia filicifolia A.Cunn. ex Benth.
Boronia filifolia F.Muell.
Boronia floribunda Sieber ex Rchb.
Boronia foetida Duretto
Boronia forsteri Duretto
Boronia fraseri Hook.
Boronia galbraithiae Albr.
Boronia glabra (Maiden & Betche) Cheel
Boronia gracilipes F.Muell.
Boronia grandisepala F.Muell.
Boronia granitica Maiden & Betche
Boronia gravicocca Duretto
Boronia grimshawii Duretto
Boronia gunnii Hook.f.
Boronia hapalophylla Duretto, F.J.Edwards & P.G.Edwards
Boronia hartleyi Duretto & Bayly
Boronia hemichiton Duretto
Boronia heterophylla F.Muell.
Boronia hippopalus Duretto, orthographic variant Boronia hippopala
Boronia hoipolloi Duretto
Boronia humifusa Paul G.Wilson
Boronia imlayensis Duretto
Boronia inornata Turcz.
Boronia interrex R.L.Barrett, M.D.Barrett & Duretto
Boronia jensziae Duretto
Boronia jucunda Duretto
Boronia juncea Bartl.
Boronia kalumburuensis Duretto
Boronia keysii Domin
Boronia koniambiensis Däniker
Boronia lanceolata F.Muell.
Boronia lanuginosa Endl.
Boronia latipinna J.H.Willis
Boronia laxa Duretto
Boronia ledifolia (Vent.) DC.
Boronia marcoana R.L.Barrett & M.D.Barrett
Boronia megastigma Nees ex Bartlett
Boronia microphylla Sieber ex Rchb.
Boronia minutipinna Duretto
Boronia mollis A.Cunn. ex Lindl.
Boronia molloyae J.R.Drumm.
Boronia muelleri (Benth.) Cheel
Boronia nematophylla F.Muell.
Boronia obovata C.T.White
Boronia octandra Paul G.Wilson
Boronia odorata Duretto
Boronia oxyantha Turcz.
Boronia palasepala Duretto
Boronia pancheri (Baill.) Duretto & Bayly
Boronia parviflora Sm.
Boronia parvifolia (Baker f.) Duretto & Bayly
Boronia pauciflora W.Fitzg.
Boronia pilosa Labill.
Boronia pinnata Sm.
Boronia prolixa Duretto
Boronia pulchella Turcz.
Boronia purdieana Diels
Boronia quadrilata Duretto
Boronia quinkanensis Duretto
Boronia repanda (F.Muell. ex Maiden & Betche) Maiden & Betche
Boronia revoluta Paul G.Wilson
Boronia rhomboidea Hook.
Boronia rivularis C.T.White
Boronia rosmarinifolia A.Cunn. ex Endl.
Boronia rozefeldsii Duretto
Boronia rubiginosa A.Cunn. ex Endl.
Boronia rupicola Duretto
Boronia ruppii Cheel
Boronia safrolifera Cheel
Boronia scabra Lindl.
Boronia serrulata Sm.
Boronia spathulata Lindl.
Boronia splendida Duretto
Boronia squamipetala Duretto
Boronia stricta Bartl.
Boronia suberosa Duretto
Boronia subulifolia Cheel
Boronia ternata Endl.
Boronia tetragona Paul G.Wilson
Boronia tetrandra Labill.
Boronia thedae R.L.Barrett, M.D.Barrett & Duretto
Boronia thujona Penfold & M.B.Welch
Boronia tolerans Duretto
Boronia umbellata P.H.Weston
Boronia verecunda Duretto
Boronia virgata Paul G.Wilson
Boronia viridiflora Duretto
Boronia warrumbunglensis P.H.Weston
Boronia whitei Cheel
Boronia wilsonii (F.Muell. ex Benth.) Duretto
Boronia xanthastrum Duretto
Boronia zeteticorum Duretto

Unplaced names:
Boronia ovata Lindl.
Boronia tenuior Domin

Former species
Species no longer placed in Boronia include:
Cyanothamnus acanthocladus (Paul G.Wilson) Duretto & Heslewood (formerly Boronia acanthoclada)
Cyanothamnus anemonifolius (A.Cunn.) Duretto & Heslewood  – sticky boronia (formerly Boronia anemonifolia) 
Cyanothamnus baeckeaceus (F.Muell.) Duretto & Heslewood (formerly Boronia baeckeacea)
Cyanothamnus bipinnatus (Lindl.) Duretto & Heslewood – rock boronia (formerly Boronia bipinnata) 
Cyanothamnus bussellianus (F.Muell.) Duretto & Heslewood (formerly Boronia busselliana)
Cyanothamnus coerulescens  (F.Muell.)  Duretto & Heslewood – blue boronia (formerly Boronia coerulescens)
Cyanothamnus defoliatus (F.Muell.) Duretto & Heslewood (formerly Boronia defoliata)
Cyanothamnus fabianoides (Diels) Duretto & Heslewood (formerly Boronia fabianoides)
Cyanothamnus inconspicuus (Benth.) Duretto & Heslewood (formerly Boronia inconspicua)
Cyanothamnus inflexus (Duretto) Duretto & Heslewood (formerly Boronia inflexa)
Cyanothamnus montimulliganensis (Duretto) Duretto & Heslewood (formerly Boronia montimulliganensis)
Cyanothamnus nanus (Hook.) Duretto & Heslewood – small boronia (formerly Boronia nana)
Cyanothamnus occidentalis (Duretto) Duretto & Heslewood (formerly Boronia occidentalis) 
Cyanothamnus penicillatus (Benth.) Duretto & Heslewood (formerly Boronia penicillata) 
Cyanothamnus polygalifolius (Sm.) Duretto & Heslewood – waxy boronia, dwarf boronia, milkwort boronia(formerly Boronia polygalifolia) 
Cyanothamnus quadrangulus Duretto & Heslewood  – narrow-leaved boronia (formerly Boronia anethifolia) 
Cyanothamnus ramosus Lindl. (formerly Boronia ramosa) 
Cyanothamnus rigens (Cheel) Duretto & Heslewood  – stiff boronia (formerly Boronia rigens) 
Cyanothamnus subsessilis Benth. Duretto & Heslewood (formerly Boronia subsessilis)
Cyanothamnus tenuis Lindl. – blue boronia (formerly Boronia tenuis)
Cyanothamnus warangensis (Duretto) Duretto & Heslewood (formerly Boronia warangensis)
Cyanothamnus westringioides (Paul G.Wilson) Duretto & Heslewood (formerly Boronia westringioides) 
Cyanothamnus yarrowmerensis (Duretto) Duretto & Heslewood (formerly Boronia yarrowmerensis)

References

Boronia species
Boronia